The London and North Eastern Railway Class A2/2 was a class of six 4-6-2 steam locomotives rebuilt by Edward Thompson in 1943 and 1944 from his predecessor's P2 Class of 2-8-2 express passenger locomotives. The rebuilds were not particularly successful and all were withdrawn and scrapped between 1959 and 1961.

Background
On taking up office as chief mechanical engineer of the London and North Eastern Railway in April 1941, Edward Thompson proposed an unstreamlined mixed traffic version of Nigel Gresley's A4 Class Pacifics with  driving wheels, but new construction would not have been authorised at this time. He therefore rebuilt the six of his predecessor's 2-8-2 P2 Class express passenger locomotives as Pacific locomotives to try out his own thoughts on their design. The P2 Class 2-8-2s had been built between 1934 and 1936 for service between Edinburgh and Aberdeen and had proved to be powerful and capable locomotives. However, the long fixed wheelbase was not ideally suited to the winding route, giving rise to maintenance problems on both the track and the locomotives, notably failure of the crank axle. Contrarily, O. S. Nock stated that the P2 class 'rode easily and elegantly around the sharpest curves.' In either event, rather than transfer the locomotives to other duties on the East Coast Main Line south of Newcastle, where this would have been less of a problem, Thompson saw this as a chance to try out his own ideas of locomotive design.

Design
The pony truck and front coupled wheels of the original design were replaced by a newly designed bogie. Rather than have all three cylinders driving a single axle Thompson adopted divided drive with the middle cylinder driving the first pair of driving wheels and the outside cylinders the middle pair. However, In order to retain the original three connecting rods of the same length, the outside cylinders were set back behind the bogie, giving the locomotives an ungainly appearance. Thompson also removed the Gresley conjugated valve gear and instead fitted independent sets of Walschaerts valve gear to each cylinder. The first locomotive to be rebuilt at Doncaster Works was No. 2005, Thane of Fife,  which was ordered in October 1942 and completed in January 1943. After trials the remaining five P2 locomotives were ordered to be rebuilt in September 1943 and they all appeared in traffic during 1944.

Performance
The new design steamed well and retained much of the power of the P2's. The reduced weight meant they had a high power to weight ratio, and were good at hauling high speed expresses, although in the opinion of Nock, they "acquired a particularly bad reputation for wild and unsafe riding at high speed!" However, there were other problems which prevented them from ever making an impact on the east coast main line. The first of these was a lack of adhesion causing wheel slip when starting, which meant that they could not be used on the Edinburgh-Aberdeen line for which they had originally been built. The second problem was that of reliability caused by their having been adapted from quite different locomotives. Both the A2/2 and the subsequent A2/3 suffered badly from frame movement, vibration and loose fittings. Using equal length connecting rods, as well as the divided drive meant that the centre cylinder was much further forward than the outside cylinders. During their lifetime in service  Earl Marischal was the only A2/2 to cover over one million miles, 360,907 as a P2 and 673,947 as an A2/2. The information in the infobox (right) is taken from Ian Allan ABC.

Withdrawal 

Withdrawals from stock began in 1959 starting with 60505 Thane Of Fife on 10 November that year. The next A2/2 to be withdrawn was Lord President on 27 November. 60501 Cock o' the North was withdrawn in 1960, while 60504 and 60506 were withdrawn in 1961, with 60502 the last member of the class withdrawn on 3 July that year.

Stock list 

The LNER/BR stock list was as follows:

Models

Apple Green Engines produce a ready-to-run model of the A2/2 in 4 mm scale. PDK, DJH, and Millholme sell 4 mm scale kits of the A2/2. Crownline have also produced a 4 mm scale kit in the past, but this is no longer available.

DJH also sell a kit of the A2/2 for O gauge (7 mm scale).

Hornby announced that they will produce a number of A2/2 models for their 2020 range, these becoming available in 2021.
The initial releases included:

R3830 - 60501 'Cock o' the North' in BR green with early emblem

R3831 - 60505 'Thane of Fife' in BR green with late crest

R3977 - 60502 'Earl Marischal' in BR green with late crest

Each release included variations based on prototype allocations and modifications through the life of the class (boiler types and fittings).

References

External links 

 The Thompson A2/2 Pacifics LNER Encyclopedia

A2 2
4-6-2 locomotives
Railway locomotives introduced in 1943
Scrapped locomotives
Standard gauge steam locomotives of Great Britain
2′C1′ h3 locomotives
Rebuilt locomotives
Passenger locomotives